Municipal elections were held in Finland on 18 October 1992.

National results

References

Municipal elections in Finland
Municipal
Finland